Yago Santos (born 3 April 2003) is a Brazilian professional footballer who plays for Palmeiras.

Club career 
Yago Santos made his professional debut for Palmeiras on the 10 December 2021, replacing fellow academy graduate Vitor Hugo in a 1–0 home win against Ceará, concluding the Serie A season of the recent Copa Libertadores winners.

References

External links

2003 births
Living people
Brazilian footballers
Association football midfielders
Sportspeople from Santos, São Paulo
Sociedade Esportiva Palmeiras players
Campeonato Brasileiro Série A players